Thomas Dawson (15 December 1901 – 30 November 1977) was an English footballer who played in the Football League for Clapton Orient, Gateshead and Stoke City.

Career
Dawson was born in Durham and worked as a miner, playing football for Washington Colliery and Chopwell Institute before joining Stoke City in 1924. He was used as back up to Bob McGrory and due to his consistency Dawson found it very difficult to break into the first team. He was then installed as captain of Stoke's reserve side and spent eight seasons at the Victoria Ground making just 24 appearances in the first team. He played a season with Clapton Orient and then back in his home of the north east with Gateshead.

Career statistics
Source:

Honours
 Stoke City
Football League Third Division North Champions: 1926–27

References

1901 births
1977 deaths
Sportspeople from Durham, England
Footballers from County Durham
Association football defenders
English footballers
Washington F.C. players
Chopwell Institute F.C. players
Stoke City F.C. players
Leyton Orient F.C. players
Gateshead A.F.C. players
Grimsby Town F.C. non-playing staff
English Football League players